The Arena of Nîmes is a Roman amphitheatre, situated in the French city of Nîmes. Built around 70 CE, shortly after the Colosseum of Rome, it is one of the best-preserved Roman amphitheatres in the world.It is 133 meters long (145 yards) and 101 meters wide (110 yards), with an arena measuring 68 meters (74 yards) by 38 meters (32 yards). The outer facade is 21 meters high (69 feet) with two stories of 60 arcades. It is among the 20 largest Roman amphitheatres of the 400 in existence. In Roman times, the building could hold 24,000 spectators, who were spread over 34 tiers of terraces divided into four self-contained zones or maeniana. The arena served as a public event theatre built by the Romans as well as a gladiator fighting arena.

Today, the Arena of Nîmes is the site of two annual bullfights during the Feria de Nîmes, and it is also used for other public events like the reenactment about antiquity "The great Roman Games" or concerts.

History

Roman amphitheatres first appeared in Southern Italy in the second century BCE and were specifically designed for putting on spectacular combats between gladiators or animal fights, this new type of construction took the form of two theatres set face to face with an oval arena which allowed everyone, wherever they were sitting, to see the spectacles being acted out in the sand covering below, without danger of missing anything.

At its high point, in the first and second centuries, the Roman Empire was a prosperous, urbanised society. In the third century CE, this stability was shattered by crisis. The empire was torn apart by civil wars, the barbarians became more frightening and epidemics made the whole situation worse. As gladiatorial fighting was an urban phenomenon, it declined at the same time as the cities.

From the fourth century, the city of Nîmes began to retract and strengthen its defences. The arcades of the amphitheatre were blocked up and the monument became an important part of the defence of Nîmes. A large number of people from the town took refuge inside the former amphitheatre that had now become a fortified castle. It suffered several sieges, but the amphitheatre has proved its very effective defence. In 725, Arabs from Spain annihilated the Visigoth kingdom by taking control of Nîmes. Thirty years later, they, in turn, were hunted out by the Franks, who finally settled in Nîmes. However, the city was now only a shadow of its former Roman self.

It was not until the 12th century that a new expansion was to occur. As a sign of this renewal, in 1194, the Count of Toulouse authorised its vassals in Nîmes to build a new city wall, whose layout corresponded more or less to the boulevards of the town that we see today. At that time, the amphitheatre was still an important element in the town defence system. A real little neighbourhood grew up there, with its own churches of St Peter and St Martin. Gradually, over the course of the 14th century, the amphitheatre lost its military value but remained a residential quarter.

Influenced by the ideas of the Renaissance, King Francis I wanted to get the amphitheatre back its ancient appearance, but all that was done at that time was to clear away the buildings from the first floor gallery. By the 18th century, there were still 150 houses inside the arena with hundreds of people living in them. The clearing of the monument began in 1786 when the houses cluttering it were demolished. Only two walled arcades with their medieval windows have been preserved, opposite the Palace of Justice, providing us with a reminder of that period. In the middle of the 19th century, the architect Henri Revoil completed the restoration of the monument. Since 1853, when the first bullfight took place, the public has once again been able to watch festivities, sporting events, entertainments and bullfights at regular intervals.

The statue of Christian Montcouquiol, known as Nimeño II, stands at the entrance, called "Hero".

In 1853, balloonist M. Louis Deschamps was killed during his 120th flight from the Arena of Nîmes. Bad weather had already forced the mayor to call off a parachute performance, but the balloon took off as planned and got caught in the bad weather. Deschamps was thrown from the basket and the balloon went down about half a mile further.

Modern use
French New Wave filmmaker François Truffaut filmed part of his first film, Les Mistons, in 1957.

British rock band Dire Straits recorded some of the live video and album, On the Night, in May 1992.

German industrial metal group Rammstein recorded the majority of their DVD, Völkerball, on July 23, 2005.

American heavy metal band Metallica recorded their DVD, Français Pour Une Nuit, on July 7, 2009.

WWE hosted a house show in 2009 and in 2011.

French electronic group Justice recorded live album Access All Arenas on July 19, 2012.

Depeche Mode performed at the Roman amphitheatre three times: on August 8, 1986, during their Black Celebration Tour, on July 20, 2006, during their Touring the Angel, and on July 16, 2013, during their Delta Machine Tour. The 2006 show was recorded for the group's live album project Recording the Angel.

David Gilmour Live in Nîmes - 20/21th July 2016

The music festival Festival de Nîmes has taken place in the arena every summer since 1997. It celebrated 20 years with a major event in 2017.

The 2017 Vuelta a España included the arena in the route of its opening stage, a 13,7 km (8,51 mile) team time trial, which was won by the BMC Racing Team.

Gallery

See also
 List of Roman amphitheatres

References

External links

 Official web site of the Arena and other Roman monuments of Nîmes 
 The Roman amphitheatre at Nimes Tourisme 
 Nimes Arena (archived)
 Photos of the Arenas of Nîmes

Roman Nîmes
Roman sites in Provence
Roman amphitheatres in France
Buildings and structures in Nîmes
Tourist attractions in Nîmes
Bullrings in France